Richard B. Fisher (1936 – December 16, 2004) was president and chairman of the securities firm Morgan Stanley.

Early life and education
Fisher was born in Philadelphia. In 1944 at age 8, Fisher contracted a severe case of polio.  Doctors told his parents that Fisher should be put in a trade school where he could learn to do things with his hands.  One doctor saw Fisher's potential, and even though his parents had little money, he was able to attend the William Penn Charter School on a full scholarship.

Career
Fisher became the Chairman Emeritus of Morgan Stanley Dean Witter & Co. in 2000.

Personal life
Fisher was a noted art collector, with paintings by Willem de Kooning, Robert Motherwell, Franz Kline, as well as younger artists such as Robert Baribeau, in his collection of abstract expressionists.

References

1936 births
2004 deaths
Harvard Business School alumni
Princeton University alumni
People with polio
William Penn Charter School alumni